LHT may refer to:
 López Hermanos Toledo, a hardware store located in Toledo, Spain.
 Lufthansa Technik, a subsidiary of the Lufthansa Group
 Left Hand Traffic, in the context of Right- and left-hand traffic
 Lawrence Hopewell Trail, a multi-use trail in New Jersey
 Laurel Hill Tunnel, an abandoned Pennsylvania Turnpike tunnel
 Lincoln Heritage Trail, a designated highway route in the United States
 Lwoff-Horne-Tournier, a method of the virus classification